Tizab (also Romanized as Tīzāb; also known as Tīr Āb) is a village in Bakhtajerd Rural District, in the Central District of Darab County, Fars Province, Iran. At the 2006 census, its population was 1,547, in 367 families.

References 

Populated places in Darab County